It Takes a Thief is a Hong Kong television series adapted from Gu Long's Chu Liuxiang Series. The series was first broadcast on RTV (now ATV) in Hong Kong in September 1979.

Changes in title and characters' names
The series' original Chinese title was 盜帥留香 (Dou Seoi Lau Heung; literally "Bandit Chief Liuxiang"). It was released around the same time as Chor Lau-heung, a similar television series produced by TVB. RTV and TVB became involved in copyright lawsuits against each other because of similarities between It Takes a Thief and Chor Lau-heung. TVB won the lawsuits and eventually RTV had to change the Chinese title of It Takes a Thief from 盜帥留香 to 俠盜風流, and the names of characters in the television series. The name of the protagonist Chor Lau-heung (Cantonese for "Chu Liuxiang") was changed to "Dou Seoi" (盜帥; literally "Bandit Chief"), one of Chu Liuxiang's nicknames in the novels. It Takes a Thief started airing on 1 September 1979, two days earlier than TVB's Chor Lau-heung.

Cast
 Note: Some of the characters' names are in Cantonese romanisation.

External links

1979 Hong Kong television series debuts
1979 Hong Kong television series endings
Hong Kong wuxia television series
Works based on Chu Liuxiang (novel series)
Cantonese-language television shows
Television shows based on works by Gu Long